Big Brother or Big Brother Sverige was the Swedish version of the reality television franchise Big Brother created by producer John de Mol in 1999. The show followed a number of contestants, known as housemates, who are isolated from the outside world for an extended period of time in a custom-built house. Each week, one of the housemates is evicted by a public vote, with the last housemate remaining winning a cash prize.

The show was aired in 2000 and again from 2002 to 2004 on Kanal 5, from 2011 to 2012 on TV11, Kanal 11 on 2015 and finally on Sjuan from 2020 to 2021.

The show was finally brought to an end when TV4 cancelled Big Brother Sverige on Christmas Eve in 2021, after 9 seasons and 913 episodes due to low ratings.

Series overview

Big Brother 1 
The first season of Big Brother Sverige started on 4 September 2000 and ended on 15  December 2000 lasting for 103 days. Being one of the first ten countries to air the format, the show saw several "worlds first" in the game.

After nine original contestants entered the house on launch night, Daniel Hellström would eventually walk only three days later. In the second week Eva Pederson, single mother of four, walked as well which resulted in only seven housemates being eligible for the first nomination and two replacements making their way into the house before the very first official eviction.

Having a diverse cast, the audience witnessed a lot of arguments and misunderstandings between the contestants mainly between the "sexual experiential" housemates and the more conservative ones. Angelica Freij, the 33-year-old mother of six, felt offended by the close relationship between lesbian Anna Bäckelin and bisexual Paula Glantz. However, in a conversation with Anna, she admitted to never having any contact with homosexuals and the experience of living with some of them in the house (many housemates stated to be bisexual in that season) opened some new points of view for her which earned her a lot of sympathy from the viewers.

The girl-girl relationship between Paula and Anna got troubled when female's favorite Christoffer Jensen re-entered the house after being evicted and started to fancy Paula, who then decided "to go hetero" for the rest of the season and concentrated on Christoffer, mostly to Anna's disappointment.

Together with Christoffer, two new housemates entered the house on Day 61 with only one of them eventually being allowed to stay in the house as the replacement contestant for Johan Hellström, who had, recently, voluntarily left the house. When the housemates voted for Christoffer to stay in the house, he became the first contestant to replace two different housemates (he has also been the replacement for Daniel Hellström earlier that series) and Big Brother saw its first double eviction with Camilla Björk and Dieck leaving the house at the very same time.

It was also the first time in Big Brother history that a replacement housemate made it to the final day (again Christoffer Jensen, who achieved the second runner up position) and most prominently, that Angelica became the first woman worldwide to win the show.

Being responsible for the very first reality TV show Expedition Robinson, Sweden embraced its first local Big Brother season and the show was a huge rating hit. Per Holknekt who finished fifth place in the first season became a well-known fashion designer.

Nominations table

Big Brother Stjärnveckan 
After being off-air for more than a year, Big Brother Sverige returned with a spin-off called Big Brother Stjärnveckan (Week of the Stars) on 20 January 2002 lasting for six days only and is, therefore, the shortest version of any Big Brother series worldwide. Seven former Swedish contestants from several reality shows lived together in the house with daily evictions. The show was aired in the week before the start of the actual second season of Big Brother Sverige and was supposed to create excitement between the viewers.

The contestants that entered the house were Anki Lundberg from The Bar 3, Johan "Godzilla" Lennström and Anneli from Villa Medusa, Elizabeth "Lelle" Anderzén from Expedition Robinson 1998, Henric Olsson from The Bar 2, Robert "Robban" Andersson from Expedition Robinson 1999 and Karin Stor from the first Big Brother Sverige season. However, being the only person that already experienced to be in the house did not work in Karin's favor as she was the first person to be evicted.

After a week, Anki Lundberg won the show on the day of the start of the second season.

Nominations table

Big Brother 2 
Season two of Big Brother Sverige started on 26 January 2002, exactly on the final day of Big Brother Stjärnveckan lasting for 108 days until 13 May 2002.

To follow the footsteps of season one, the cast of the sophomore season included even more exotic and mostly very attractive contestants which saw more sexual interactions than any other Big Brother season of that time with once again a threeway relationship, this time between Dominique Pons and both Emma-Maria Carlsson and punk Kitty Jutbring. But when Emma-Maria voluntary left the house and Dominique was evicted in one of the earlier rounds the focus turned on other showmances such as between Elin Nilsson and Jacob Heidrich or Benjamin Sorani and Marie "Picasso" Pettersson.

Marie was earlier voted to become the replacement for Emma-Marie between three different girls that entered the house together and Benjamin has been originally evicted on Day 62 but was allowed a return a week later after several viewers were unable to vote in what has been a close vote between him and fellow-nominee Jacob. However, when Big Brother offered the housemate that would walk 50,000 kronor Benjamin left the house voluntary only two weeks after his comeback.

For the third time in a row, the Swedish audience chose a female to win their Big Brother season - this time it was Ulrica Andersson from Karlstad but the most famous housemate resulting from that season was undoubtedly Marie Picasso, who tried to break into music business with recording two singles and becoming the host of a call-in show without any significant success. In 2007 she auditioned for Sweden's local version of Pop Idol called Idol 2007 which she won resulting in a no.1 single called This Moment.

Nominations table

Notes:
 Amelie, Lisa, and Marie were exempt from nominations and automatically nominated for eviction as they were new housemates. The two who received the most votes would be evicted.
 Due to technical problems with the fifth eviction, a number of viewers were unable to vote. As voting numbers between Benjamín and Jacob were close, it was decided to allow Benjamín to return.
 On day 83 Big brother made an offer to the seven remaining housemates. The offer was that if any housemate would leave the house they would receive 50,000 kronor, Benjamin accepted the offer.
The public were voting for a winner. Peter received the fewest votes and was evicted.

Big Brother 3 
Season three of Big Brother Sverige started on 25 January 2003, lasting for 107 days until 11 May 2003.

Nominations table

Notes:
 In the first round of nominations the public voted for the housemates they wanted to be nominated. Since Marika and Peter received the most votes they were nominated for eviction and the housemates had to vote to evict one of them.
 Big brother awarded nomination points for rule breaking.
 Christian and Mattias were nominated by Big brother for rule breaking.
 Big Brother awarded Micke 4 points for rule breaking.

Big Brother 4 
Season four of Big Brother Sverige started on 23 January 2004, lasting for 109 days until 10 May 2004.

Nominations table

Notes:
 Owing to rule breaking, Big brother gave Carolina two extra nomination points, Foffo, Olivier, and Stefan eight extra points and Jean ten extra points.
 The nominations were voided by Big Brother and all six housemates were put up for eviction.
 The three or more Housemates with the most points were up for eviction.
 Henrik won immunity from eviction, all other housemates were put up for eviction.
 In round six and seven of nominations only two Housemates could be up for eviction, so the housemate who received the most points could save one of the others. 
 Two days before the final an eviction took place based on the number of votes to win housemates had received so far. Since Henrik received the fewest votes he was evicted.

References

External links 
 on TV4

World of Big Brother

2000 Swedish television series debuts
 
Kanal 5 (Swedish TV channel) original programming